Floor Jansen (born 21 February 1981) is a Dutch singer and songwriter. She is the lead vocalist of Finnish symphonic metal band Nightwish.

Jansen first became known as a member of symphonic metal band After Forever, standing as their lead vocalist from 1997, when she joined at age 16, to their disbanding in 2009. When After Forever disbanded, she formed ReVamp and has released two albums with them. In 2012 following the departure of their lead vocalist Anette Olzon, Nightwish brought in Jansen as a touring member until the end of their Imaginaerum World Tour. In 2013, they announced Jansen was now their full-time lead vocalist; she subsequently disbanded ReVamp to focus on Nightwish. In 2018, she and Pagan's Mind guitarist Jørn Viggo Lofstad premiered their hard rock duo Northward.

A frequent collaborator of Arjen Anthony Lucassen, Jansen is a member of his progressive metal supergroup Star One, and sang in the Ayreon albums Universal Migrator Part 1: The Dream Sequencer, 01011001, and The Source, as well as the live album Ayreon Universe – The Best of Ayreon Live. She also sang lead vocals in several songs of the MaYan album Quarterpast and in Avalon's Angels of the Apocalypse. She is the older sister of fellow singer Irene Jansen, who also worked with Ayreon.

Biography

After Forever (1997–2009)

Jansen was sixteen when she joined Apocalypse (later known as After Forever) in 1997. Three years later the band released its first album, Prison of Desire. She co-wrote the band's words and music with Mark Jansen (no relation) until he left in 2002, after which she was the band's sole composer. Before becoming a full-time musician, she worked as a singing teacher.

Because of the burnout that After Forever bandmate Sander Gommans underwent, the band took a year off starting in January 2008 but ultimately decided to call it quits in February 2009. Jansen posted on her website that she was writing music with Jørn Viggo Lofstad (Pagan's Mind, Jørn Lande) for a new musical project, but the two did not publish as Northward until ten years later.

ReVamp (2009–2016)

On 17 October 2009, Jansen announced via MySpace that the name of her new band was ReVamp. ReVamp's first album was produced with After Forever keyboardist Joost van den Broek, bass player Jaap Melman (formerly of Dreadlock Pussy) and guitarist Waldemar Sorychta (Grip Inc., Voodoocult, Eyes of Eden and Despair) as songwriters and producers. The final line-up of ReVamp featured keyboardist Ruben Wijga, bass player Jaap Melman, guitarists Jord Otto and Arjan Rijnen and drummer Matthias Landes.

In August 2011, Van Canto announced on Facebook, that ReVamp would no longer participate in their Out of the Dark tour, as Jansen suffered a burnout herself.

In late 2011, Jansen joined her former bandmate Mark Jansen in his band Mayan's Latin American tour, performing in São Paulo. In 2012, Jansen joined Adrenaline Mob on stage in Bochum and Weert. ReVamp's second album, Wild Card, was released in 2013.

ReVamp announced its breakup in September 2016, citing Floor Jansen's inability to participate fully in both ReVamp and Nightwish.

Nightwish (2012–present)
After Nightwish's previous lead vocalist Anette Olzon parted ways with the band, Jansen acted as Nightwish's live lead vocalist for the remainder of the Imaginaerum World Tour in 2012. Her first show with the band was in Seattle in October. When commenting on the experience, she said:

On 9 October 2013, Nightwish announced Jansen as Olzon's permanent replacement in the band. In 2015, Nightwish released their first studio album featuring Jansen as the lead vocalist, which was Endless Forms Most Beautiful. Along with the album the band announced a world tour. Out of this came the live album Vehicle of Spirit 
which is the second live album to feature Floor.

In 2018, Nightwish announced their Decades world tour, commemorating all of their works as a band. The second studio album with Jansen as lead vocalist, Human. :II: Nature., was released on 10 April 2020. After several cancellations and reschedulings due to COVID-19 concerns, Nightwish is currently touring for this album.

Solo career (2020–present) 
Jansen performed her first solo concert in January 2020. Due to the restrictions during the COVID-19 pandemic, the final shows of the tour had to be postponed, and finally took place in summer 2021.  On 2 August 2021, Jansen had confirmed in an interview that she is working on a solo album. The album has been aimed for a 2023 release. Jansen released her first single "Fire" on 25 March 2022. Her second solo single, "Storm", was released on 27 May 2022. Her third solo single, "Me Without You", was released on 8 September 2022. The fourth solo single called "Invincible"  was released on 13 January 2023. The album, called "Paragon" was confirmed to be released on 24 March 2023.

Other works 
Three albums by the Dutch composer and multi-instrumentalist Arjen Anthony Lucassen's project Ayreon include guest vocals from Jansen: she sang backing vocals on "My House on Mars" from the album Universal Migrator Part 1: The Dream Sequencer, played the character of Forever, referred to as Ω, (Coincidentally, Jansen used the Ω symbol as an emblem for her band Revamp, and she has the symbol tattooed on her wrist) on seven songs from the album 01011001, and was featured as a character named The Biologist on the album The Source. She is also a member of Lucassen's heavy metal supergroup Star One, and was featured on the studio albums Space Metal and Victims of the Modern Age. She was also featured in the 2018 live album Ayreon Universe – The Best of Ayreon Live.

On 9 December 2013, she was also announced as the main vocalist, playing the lead role, for the second full-length album of former Stratovarius guitarist Timo Tolkki's metal opera act Avalon. The album, Angels of the Apocalypse, was released on 16 May 2014. She has also been a guest for the metal band Nightmare.

On 22 February 2018, Northward, a hard rock project by Jansen and Pagan's Mind guitarist Jørn Viggo Lofstad, was unveiled. The two created the project in 2007, writing an entire album worth of music in 2008 but being unable to record previously due to their busy schedules; they ultimately reunited in 2017 to finally record the album, which was released on 19 October 2018 under their signed label Nuclear Blast. The album features a duet between Jansen and her sister Irene.

In 2019, Jansen participated in the Dutch reality TV show Beste Zangers. In the last episode she partnered with classical singer Henk Poort to perform "The Phantom of the Opera", which was later released as a single. It reached number one on the Dutch single charts, and allowed Jansen to go on a sold-out solo tour in the Netherlands. She also won the Popprijs 2019, a prestigious Dutch award for the artist or band with an important contribution to Dutch pop music in the past year. Among her other performances for Beste Zangers was a solo version of "Shallow", and a separate acoustic duet version of the same song with Tim Akkerman. In 2022, she performed in the German version of Beste Zangers: "Sing meinem Song - Das Tauschkonzert".

Personal life
As a child, she wanted to be a biologist; coincidentally, she played the character "The Biologist" in the Ayreon album The Source.

Between 2014 and 2015, Jansen lived in Joensuu, the capital of North Karelia.

Jansen has previously been in a relationship with After Forever guitarist Sander Gommans.

On 18 September 2016, it was announced, that Jansen and her husband Hannes Van Dahl, the drummer of Sabaton, were expecting their first child. On 15 March 2017, Jansen announced via Instagram that she had given birth to a girl.

Jansen is vegetarian

In 2018, a new species of beetle was discovered by scientist Andreas Weigel. It was named after Jansen, dubbing it Tmesisternus floorjansenae. This makes Floor Jansen the second Nightwish member to be a namesake for a newly discovered species, as a new kind of fungus gnat was discovered back in 2017 by Finnish biologist Jukka Salmela, who named the species after Tuomas Holopainen. Jansen herself announced the news on Facebook.

In 2020 a new species of brittle star, Ophiomitrella floorae of late Maastrichtian age (c. 66.7 Ma) was named after Floor Jansen.

On 26 October 2022, Jansen announced that she was diagnosed with breast cancer, and went to undergo surgery for it the following day. Two days following the announcement, Jansen confirmed that the surgery went well. On 18 November, Jansen announced that she was now cancer free.

In March 2023, Floor announced she was expecting their second child.

Singing style
Jansen can sing from classical to belting and raspy vocals like screaming and death growls. She is a soprano with a range of more than three octaves (C3 to F6).

Jansen started studying music at the Dutch Rock Academy in 1999, entering the Conservatorium Tilburg three years later. She studied musical theatre and a year of opera. When After Forever split up, she started teaching performing in her own course called Wanna be a Star?!

She used to play the guitar, piano and flute, and has completed several years of music studies.

Discography

Studio albums:
 Paragon (2023)

After Forever
Studio albums
 Prison of Desire (2000)
 Decipher (2001)
 Invisible Circles (2004)
 Remagine (2005)
 After Forever (2007)

EPs
 Exordium (2003)

Nightwish
Studio albums
 Endless Forms Most Beautiful (2015)
 Human. :II: Nature. (2020)
Live albums
 Showtime, Storytime (2013)
 Vehicle of Spirit (2016)
 Decades: Live in Buenos Aires (2019)

Northward
Studio albums
 Northward (2018)

ReVamp
Studio albums
 ReVamp (2010)
 Wild Card (2013)

Star One
Studio albums
 Space Metal (2002)
 Victims of the Modern Age (2010)
 Revel in Time (2022)
Live albums
 Live on Earth (2003)

Filmography 
Soaring Highs and Brutal Lows: The Voices of Women in Metal (2015)

References

Bibliography

External links

 Personal website
 Nightwish website
 Interview with Jansen (August 2007) at metal-ways.com
 Ragnarok Radio Interview with Jansen and Lori Linstruth (December 2008) 

1981 births
Living people
Dutch women singers
Dutch heavy metal singers
Dutch women singer-songwriters
Women heavy metal singers
English-language singers from the Netherlands
People from Goirle
After Forever members
ReVamp members
Nightwish members
Singers with a three-octave vocal range
Star One (band) members
Women in metal
Dutch atheists
Dutch expatriates in Finland